Clow may refer to:

 Clow (surname)
 Clow, Arkansas
 Clow International Airport, in Bolingbrook, Illinois
 Clow Island, an island in Lake Fryxell, Victoria Land, Antarctica
 Clow Reed, a fictional character in the Cardcaptor Sakura series
 Clow Township, Kittson County, Minnesota
 Clow Valve Company, a subsidiary of McWane, Inc.

See also